Vinícius Augusto Tobías da Silva (born 23 February 2004), known as Vinicius Tobias, is a Brazilian professional footballer who plays as a right-back for Spanish club Real Madrid Castilla, on loan from Ukrainian Premier League club Shakhtar Donetsk.

Club career
Born in Jardim Matarazzo, São Paulo, Vinicius Tobias started his career with Internacional, joining in 2016. Growing up, he idolised fellow Brazilian full-back, Dani Alves. After impressive performances for Internacional’s youth teams, he was included in The Guardian's "Next Generation" list for 2021, highlighting the best young footballers worldwide.

In July 2021, it was announced that Vinicius Tobias would join Ukrainian side Shakhtar Donetsk in February of the following year. He left Internacional after six years playing for them. However, after the 2022 Russian invasion of Ukraine, which occurred just after Vinicius Tobias had moved to his new club, foreign footballers in Ukraine were allowed to leave their clubs on a loan basis. On 1 April 2022, he joined Spanish club Real Madrid on loan until the end of the 2022–23 season. As Real Madrid had already utilized all available non-EU slots for the first team squad, Vinicius Tobias was assigned to the Castilla team.

On 17 April 2022, Tobias made his debut for Castilla in a 2–1 loss against Alcoyano, coming on as a substitute for Peter.

Career statistics

Club

References

External links 

 Real Madrid profile
 
 
 

2004 births
Living people
Footballers from São Paulo
Brazilian footballers
Brazil youth international footballers
Association football defenders
Primera Federación players
Sport Club Internacional players
FC Shakhtar Donetsk players
Real Madrid CF players
Real Madrid Castilla footballers
Brazilian expatriate footballers
Brazilian expatriate sportspeople in Ukraine
Expatriate footballers in Ukraine
Brazilian expatriate sportspeople in Spain
Expatriate footballers in Spain